Rauni Maria Erika Luoma-Ervi (15 October 1911 – 12 January 1996) was a Finnish actress. Her career peaked at the Finnish National Theatre in 1955–1978. She also appeared in 25 films between 1935 and 1984.

Selected filmography
 A Night in Rio (1956)
 The Harvest Month (1956)

External links

1911 births
1996 deaths
Finnish film actresses
Actresses from Helsinki
20th-century Finnish actresses